Sulfurous acid (United Kingdom spelling: sulphurous acid, also known as sulfuric(IV) acid, sulphuric(IV) acid (UK), thionic acid (since it has a thionyl group attached to 2 hydroxy groups)) is the chemical compound with the formula . 

Raman spectra of solutions of sulfur dioxide in water show only signals due to the  molecule and the bisulfite ion, . The intensities of the signals are consistent with the following equilibrium:

17O NMR spectroscopy provided evidence that solutions of sulfurous acid and protonated sulfites contain a mixture of isomers, which is in equilibrium:

Attempts to concentrate the solutions of sulfurous acid simply reverses the equilibrium, producing sulfur dioxide and water vapor. A clathrate  with the formula  has been crystallised. It decomposes above 7 °C.

History and production
Sulfurous acid is commonly known to not exist in its free state, and due to this, it is stated in textbooks that it cannot be isolated in the water-free form. However, the molecule has been detected in the gas phase in 1988 by the dissociative ionization of diethyl sulfite. The conjugate bases of this elusive acid are, however, common anions, bisulfite (or hydrogen sulfite) and sulfite. Sulfurous acid is an intermediate species in the formation of acid rain from sulfur dioxide.

Uses
Aqueous solutions of sulfur dioxide, which sometimes are referred to as sulfurous acid, are used as reducing agents and as disinfectants, as are solutions of bisulfite and sulfite salts. They are oxidised to sulfuric acid or sulfate by accepting another oxygen atom.

See also
 Bisulfite
 Carbonic acid
 Pulp (paper)
 Sulfite paper pulp process
 Sulfite
 Sulfuric acid

References

Hydrogen compounds
Sulfites
Sulfur oxoacids